Chavit, also known as Chavit Singson Story  and Chavit: Blood Son of Ilocos, is a 2003 Filipino biographical drama film produced and directed by Carlo J. Caparas and starring Cesar Montano, Eddie Garcia and  Dina Bonnevie.

Premise
This movie is about the story of Luis "Chavit" Singson (born 1941), a Philippine politician, and the Governor of the Ilocos Sur province  in the Philippines. Singson started EDSA II in October 2000 when he alleged he gave Philippine President Joseph Estrada 400 million pesos as payoff from illegal gambling profits.

Estrada was put under investigation, but on January 16, 2001, a key piece of evidence was blocked in court, leading to protests in Manila and other major cities backing Vice President Gloria Macapagal Arroyo resulting in the ouster of Joseph Estrada.

Plot
The film starts with the origin of the Singsons of Ilocos Sur. Then came the birth of Jose and Caridad's second son Luis. Then came a series of killings within the province. It came as no surprise, that the Crisostomos were responsible for the killings especially during the wedding of Luis and Evelyn Verzosa. Then, Representative Claro Crisostomo endorses his wife Milagring for the governorship of the province in 1963. This became the start of the "Operation Withdraw" where all mayors of Ilocos Sur are threatened to withdraw their candidacy. Chavit became the chief of police in Vigan. Then the barangays want him to run for mayor of Vigan. But, his father decided to run and Chavit ran for councilor. Chavit became the champion of the Ilocanos especially those victims of the Crisostomos, most especially Biboy. This became the start of the rivalry between the Singsons and the Crisostomos. Chavit sought the help of Ninoy Aquino.

Then came the burning in Ora Este and Ora Centro in Bantay, Ilocos Sur. It was perpetrated by Biboy. Then, on October 18, 1970, Congressman Claro was assassinated at the Vigan Cathedral. Chavit challenged Milagring for the governorship and won. Until Martial Law came. Biboy was convicted for arson and sentenced to life imprisonment. While behind bars, Biboy suddenly had a change of heart through bible studies. Afterwards, Biboy was released. During the People Power, Chavit was ousted, but due to his charisma, he was elected to Congress, and returned to his former post. Then came the controversy of Joseph Estrada, that led to the Second People Power.

Cast
Some of the characters were changed and their real names are enclosed in parenthesis.
Cesar Montano as Luis "Chavit" Singson
Eddie Garcia as Congressman Claro Crisostomo (Floro Crisologo)
Dina Bonnevie as Evelyn Verzosa
Tommy Abuel as Jose Singson 
Tirso Cruz III as Biboy Crisostomo (Vincent "Bingbong" Crisologo)
Pinky de Leon as Governor Milagring Crisostomo (Carmeling Crisologo)
Clavel Bendaña as Imelda Marcos
Marita Zobel as Caridad Crisologo
Rommel Montano as Chavit's driver
Ricardo Cepeda as Governor Evaristo "Titong" Crisologo
Danita Paner as Anita
Jose Emmanuel Carlos as Senator Ninoy Aquino
Tess Villarama as President Corazon Aquino
Willie Nepomuceno as President Ferdinand Marcos, President Joseph Estrada and Fernando Poe Jr.
Joel Torre as Sotero
Hardie del Mundo as Ronald Singson

Production
The role played by Dina Bonnevie was originally intended for Snooky Serna. In the scene where Singson was shown crying following his brother's death, the former governor was played by his real son, Christopher. Impersonator Willie Nepomuceno played three roles in the movie, playing Ferdinand Marcos, Fernando Poe Jr. and Joseph Estrada, one of his most popular roles.

Accolades

References

The day Chavit Singson confronted Crisologo again

External links

Official Luis Chavit Singson Website

2003 films
Cultural depictions of Benigno Aquino Jr.
Cultural depictions of Corazon Aquino
Cultural depictions of Ferdinand Marcos
Filipino-language films
Philippine biographical films
Philippine films based on actual events
2000s Tagalog-language films
Viva Films films
Films directed by Carlo J. Caparas